Faisal of Iraq may refer to:
 Faisal I of Iraq, leader during the Arab Revolt
 Faisal II of Iraq